The Estonian Labour Party (ETE) was a political party in Estonia. It was formed in 1919 by a merger of the Radical Socialist Party and the Social Travaillist Party, and ceased to exist in 1932, when it merged with other centrist parties to form the National Centre Party. It was a member of government coalitions between 1919 and 1925, and again from 1927 until 1931.

History
The ETE had its roots in the Estonian Radical Socialist Party and the Social Travaillist Party, both of which were founded in 1917. The two parties collaborated closely and were collectively known as the "Labourites". Both parties won seats in the Estonian Provincial Assembly elections later in the year, and together made up the second largest faction in the Assembly. In November 1917, the Labourites received 21% of the votes in the Russian Constituent Assembly elections. In late December 1917, after the partially successful Bolshevik coup d'état in Estonia, Labourites were the first to publicly demand independence for Estonia. By the 1918 Estonian Constituent Assembly election, their support had risen to 30.4%.

After Estonia declared independence on 24 February 1918, the Labourites were part of the Estonian Provisional Government, as were all the parties, that supported Estonian independence. In March 1918, Labourite leader Jüri Vilms went missing in Finland, where he was presumably executed. He was replaced by Otto Strandman, Piip, Juhan Kukk, Theodor Pool and Seljamaa.

The two parties formally merged in 1919, and won a quarter of the seats in the 1919 Constituent Assembly elections, with Strandman heading the government formed on 8 May 1919. The party went on to win the 1920 parliamentary elections with 22 of the 100 seats in the Riigikogu. It finished third in the 1923 elections, fourth in the 1926 and 1929 elections.

In January 1932 the party merged with the United Nationalists Party (an October 1931 merger of the Estonian People's Party and the Christian People's Party) to form the National Centre Party.

Ideology
After its foundation, the Labour Party supported non-revolutionary social and agrarian reform. In the Constituent Assembly it was influential in composing the radical land reform and the 1920 constitution. Socialist during its early years, the party gradually moved towards the centre. It championed the separation of church and state.

The party drew its support from artisans, civil servants, intellectuals, small landowners and the non-socialist working class.

Heads of Government

Ministers

References

Political parties established in 1919
Defunct political parties in Estonia
Labour parties
1919 establishments in Estonia
Political parties disestablished in 1932
Socialist parties in Estonia
Political parties of the Russian Revolution